David Hadley (born October 8, 1948) is a former American football defensive back. He played for the Kansas City Chiefs from 1970 to 1971.

References

1948 births
Living people
American football defensive backs
Alcorn State Braves football players
Kansas City Chiefs players